The 2016–17 Liga Panameña de Fútbol season (also known as the Liga Cable Onda) was the 27th season of top-flight football in Panama. The season began on 2016 and was scheduled to end in May 2017. Ten teams competed throughout the entire season.

Teams
Atlético Chiriquí finished in 10th place in the overall table last season and were relegated to the Liga Nacional de Ascenso. Taking their place for this season are the overall champions of last season's Liga Nacional de Ascenso Santa Gema.

Chepo suffered financial trouble and sold their spot to Atletico Veraguense.

2016 Apertura

Personnel and sponsoring (2016 Apertura)

Managerial changes

During the season

Standings

Results

Second stage

Semifinals
First legs

Second legs

Arabe Unido won 5–3 on aggregate.

Plaza Amador won 1–0 on aggregate.

Finals 
Grand Final

2017 Clausura

Personnel and sponsoring (2017 Clausura)

Standings

Results

Second stage

Semifinals
First legs

Second legs

Arabe Unido won 2–1 on aggregate.

Tauro won 3–2 on aggregate.

Finals 
Grand Final

List of foreign players in the league
This is a list of foreign players for the 2016-2017. The following players:
have played at least one game for the respective club.
have not been capped for the Panama national football team on any level, independently from the birthplace

Alianza 
  Facundo Kroeck
  Robyn Pertuz
  Gerardo Negrete
  Mauricio Castaño

Arabe Unido
  Miguel Lloyd

Atletico Nacional
  Manuel Murillo 
  Andrés Santamaría

Atlético Veraguense 
  Damaso Pichón
  Alexis Mendoza
  Walter Franco
  Arlinto Murillo

Chorillo
  Fabio Da Silva
  David Agudelo

  Jorge Henriquez
  Justin Arboleda

Plaza Amador
  Frank Piedrahita
  Daniel Blanco

Santa Gema
  Miguel Duque

San Francisco FC
  Wanegre Delgado de Armas 
  Varcan Sterling 

Sporting San Miguelito
  None

Tauro FC
  Jose Peraza
  Carlos Sierra 
  Ariel Bonilla

 (player released mid season)

Aggregate table

External links
 https://web.archive.org/web/20181006121704/http://panamafutbol.com/?cat=3&paged=3
 http://lpf.com.pa/w/category/noticas/
 https://int.soccerway.com/national/panama/lpf/20152016/apertura/r31790/
 http://www.rpctv.com/deportes/futbolnacional/

Liga Panameña de Fútbol seasons
1
Pan